TaShawn Thomas (born February 27, 1993) is an American professional basketball player for the Metropolitans 92 of the LNB Pro A. He played college basketball for the University of Houston and the University of Oklahoma before playing professionally in Germany, Italy, Israel, France and Australia. In 2019, he was named the Israeli State Cup MVP and the Israeli League Defensive Player of the Year.

College career
A  forward from Las Vegas, Nevada, Thomas played three seasons at Houston. As a junior, he averaged 15.4 points and 8.1 rebounds per game. He opted to transfer to Oklahoma for his senior season. As a senior, Thomas was named Big 12 Newcomer of the Year and a Third Team All-Big 12 selection. He scored in double figures 17 times and had 42 blocked shots, shooting 51.4 percent for the season. In his senior year, he averaged 11.6 points and 6.5 rebounds per game.

Professional career

Mitteldeutscher (2015–2016)
After going undrafted in the 2015 NBA draft, Thomas played with the Orlando Magic in the Summer League. On July 29, 2015, Thomas signed with the German club Mitteldeutscher BC.

Vanoli Cremona (2016–2017)
On June 26, 2016, Thomas joined the Los Angeles Clippers for the 2016 NBA Summer League. On July 9, 2016, Thomas sign with the Italian club Vanoli Cremona. On January 2, 2017, Thomas recorded a career-high 25 points, shooting 9-of-14 from the field, along with six rebounds and four blocks in an 85–71 win over Varese.

Hapoel Holon (2017–2018)
On July 19, 2017, Thomas signed with the Israeli team Hapoel Holon for the 2017–18 season. Thomas helped Holon to win the 2018 Israeli State Cup, as well as reaching the 2018 Israeli League Final, where they eventually lost to Maccabi Tel Aviv. In 55 games played during the 2017–18 season (both in the Israeli League and the Champions League), Thomas averaged 10.8 points, 5 rebounds, 1.3 assists and 1.1 blocks per game.

Hapoel Jerusalem (2018–2021)
On July 2, 2018, Thomas signed a two-year deal with Hapoel Jerusalem. In September 2018, Thomas was suspended by the Israeli anti-doping agency for three months after he tested positive to Cannabis use during the Israeli League playoffs. On February 14, 2019, Thomas recorded a double-double of 15 points and 10 rebounds, leading Jerusalem to win their fifth Israeli State Cup title after an 82–67 win over Maccabi Rishon LeZion. He was subsequently named the Final MVP. On June 7, 2019, Thomas was named the Israeli League Best Defender.

On June 24, 2019, Thomas signed a two-year contract extension with Jerusalem. On January 7, 2020, Thomas recorded a season-high 23 points without missing a single shot as he went 10 of 10 from the field, along with six rebounds in an 83-74 win over Rasta Vechta. Three days later, he was named the Champions League Game Day 10 MVP. Thomas re-signed with the team on August 12. In October 2020, Thomas was named to the All-BCL First Team of the 2019–20 season.

Le Mans (2021–2022)
On July 19, 2021, Thomas signed a one-year deal with the French team Le Mans of the LNB Pro A. He was named to the All-League First-Team after the regular season.

Perth Wildcats (2022–2023)
On July 26, 2022, Thomas signed with the Perth Wildcats in Australia for the 2022–23 NBL season.

Metropolitans 92 (2023–present)
On February 17, 2023, Thomas signed with Metropolitans 92 of the LNB Pro A for the rest of the 2022–23 season.

Career statistics

College

|-
| style="text-align:left;"|2011–12
| style="text-align:left;"|Houston
| 30 || 30 || 28.2 || .577 || .000 || .542 || 8.2 || 1.1 || .8 || 2.1 || 10.7
|-
| style="text-align:left;"|2012–13
| style="text-align:left;"|Houston
| 33 || 33 || 32.5 || .552 || .111 || .638 || 9.8 || 2.4 || 1.0 || 1.7 || 16.9
|-
| style="text-align:left;"|2013–14
| style="text-align:left;"|Houston
| 33 || 33 || 31.6 || .591 || .167 || .595 || 8.1 || 1.9 || 1.2 || 2.7 || 15.4
|-
| style="text-align:left;"|2014–15
| style="text-align:left;"|Oklahoma
| 35 || 35 || 29.7 || .519 || .000 || .691 || 6.5 || 1.5 || .6 || 1.5 || 11.6
|- class="sortbottom"
| style="text-align:center;" colspan="2"|Career
| 131 || 131 || 30.5 || .559 || .100 || .622 || 8.1 || 1.7 || .9 || 2.0 || 13.7

References

External links

RealGM Profile
DraftExpress Profile

1993 births
Living people
American expatriate basketball people in Australia
American expatriate basketball people in Germany
American expatriate basketball people in Israel
American expatriate basketball people in Italy
American men's basketball players
Basketball players from Texas
Doping cases in basketball
Hapoel Holon players
Hapoel Jerusalem B.C. players
Houston Cougars men's basketball players
Le Mans Sarthe Basket players
Mitteldeutscher BC players
Oklahoma Sooners men's basketball players
Perth Wildcats players
Power forwards (basketball)
Sportspeople from Las Vegas
Vanoli Cremona players